The Lock Haven Bald Eagles football program is the intercollegiate American football team for Lock Haven University of Pennsylvania located in Lock Haven, Pennsylvania. The Bald Eagles play in the NCAA Division II and are members of the Pennsylvania State Athletic Conference.

History
Lock Haven University of Pennsylvania was founded in 1870, and played their first football games in 1900, when the school was known as Central State Normal School. The team was very successful in the early 1930s, winning the "Pennsylvania State Teachers College football championship" in 1930, 1931, 1933, and 1936. They were founding members of the Pennsylvania State Athletic Conference, joining it in 1951, and won their first conference championship in 1957. They were coached that year by Hubert Jack, who their current stadium is named after. The school's most recent conference championship was in 1979, after compiling a 9–2 record and outscoring opponents 314–168. The team declined in the following years, and have compiled a record of 2–9 or worse in eight of their last ten seasons.

Classifications
 1939–1972: NCAA College Division
 1958–1969: NAIA
 1970: NAIA Division II
 1973–1979: NCAA Division III
 1980–present: NCAA Division II

Conference memberships
 1900–1933: Independent
 1934–1950?: Pennsylvania State Teachers Conference
 1951–present: Pennsylvania State Athletic Conference

Alumni in the NFL
Lock Haven has had two alumni play in the National Football League (NFL), John Eisenhooth and Bret Shugarts.

References

External links
Official website

 
American football teams established in 1900
1900 establishments in Pennsylvania